Czesław Ciupa (2 August 1935 – 29 July 1988) was a Polish footballer. He played in three matches for the Poland national football team from 1956 to 1957.

References

External links
 
 

1935 births
1988 deaths
Polish footballers
Poland international footballers
Sportspeople from Meurthe-et-Moselle
Association football forwards
Polonia Bytom players
Legia Warsaw players
KS Lublinianka players
Avia Świdnik players